Budescu is a Romanian surname and place name that may refer to:
People:
Constantin Budescu (born 1989), Romanian football player
David Budescu, psychologist and academic
Places:
Budescu River, tributary of the Ruscova River

See also 
Budești (disambiguation)
Budișteanu
Budișteni (disambiguation)

Romanian-language surnames